Ras Abrouq (also known as Bir Zekreet) is the northernmost extension of the Zekreet Peninsula, a stretch of land to the north of Dukhan in Qatar. It has a beach of the same name and various archaeological sites. Since the 21st century it has functioned as a tourist site.

Large parts of its territory are legally protected areas that are dedicated to a nature reserve for wild deer. Richard Serra's East-West/West-East sculpture was completed in Brouq Nature Reserve in 2014 at the behest of the Qatar Museums Authority.

Etymology
In Arabic, the word "ras" translates to "head", and in this context is used to refer to a cape. The other constituent, "abrouq", is derived from the nearby range of light-colored hills in the Zekreet Peninsula (also known as the Abrouq Peninsula).

Its name is also spelled as Ras Broog.

Location
Ras Abrouq is a cape located on the tip of the Zekreet Peninsula near the city of Dukhan. It is 70 km west of the Qatari capital of Doha. Located south of Ras Abrouq is the village of Zekreet.

Archaeology
Ras Abrouq is one of the most extensive Neolithic sites in Qatar. It has one of the highest proportions of Ubaid potsherds in Qatar. Excavations in the 1970s revealed a ring-like structure, hearths, Ubaid pottery, cairns, and stone tools dating to the Neolithic period. Many fish bones and snail shells were also recovered. G.H. Smith, an excavator of the site, suggested that it was a seasonal encampment and that its inhabitants had trade relations with nearby civilizations.

Further archaeological excavations yielded Barbar ceramics originating from the Dilmun civilization dating to the third millennium BC. A number of chambered cairns dating to the same period contained 108 beads made of stone and shell.

Excavations conducted during the mid-20th century uncovered potsherds of Seleucid characteristic and a cairnfield consisting of 100 burial mounds dating to the 3rd century BC. The relatively large number of cairns suggest a sizable sea-faring community prevailed in the area during this period.

Further excavations revealed a fishing station dating to c. 140 BC which was used by foreign vessels to dry fish during the Sasanian period. A number of stone structures and large quantities of fish bones were recovered from the site.

Gallery

References

Populated places in Al-Shahaniya
Populated coastal places in Qatar
Archaeological sites in Qatar
Ubaid period